Doug Kay is a retired American football coach who was most recently assistant head coach for the Tampa Bay Storm of the Arena Football League (AFL), which league ceased operations after the 2017 season. He has more than 55 years of football experience, including 12 seasons in the AFL. He was the head coach of the Charlotte Rage, Carolina Cobras and Columbus Destroyers. He was also the head football coach at Olivet College from 1971 to 1975.

College career
Kay played college football under the tutelage of Lou Saban as a quarterback, defensive back, tight end and punter at Western Illinois University. He also played baseball at Western Illinois. He received a bachelor's degree in physical education from Western Illinois in 1961.

Coaching career

Kay's coaching career began in 1960 at his alma mater, Western Illinois University, as the quarterbacks and wide receivers coach. In 1961, Kay took over at Deerfield High School in Illinois, and coached there through the 1966 season; he was replaced by Paul Adams when he decided to return to college football.

From 1967 to 1969 Kay served as the defensive coordinator at Indiana State University. Kay was then named the head coach of Olivet College in 1970. He spent the next six seasons with Olivet before taking over as the offensive coordinator at San José State University in 1976.

Kay moved to UCLA in 1977 where he was an assistant coach, working mainly with the linebackers and defensive line. In 1980, he took over at the University of Hawaii as the associate head coach and defensive coordinator for three seasons. Kay spent four seasons in the United States Football League with the Boston/New Orleans Breakers and Tampa Bay Bandits.

His AFL experience began in 1993 as defensive coordinator of the ArenaBowl VII champion Tampa Bay Storm. Four years later, Kay was once again defensive coordinator of a championship team, helping the Arizona Rattlers capture ArenaBowl XI in 1997.

Kay was head coach of the Charlotte Rage in 1995 and returned to Charlotte as the head coach of the Carolina Cobras in 2000 and 2001. In 2001, Kay led the Cobras to their first non-losing season in their five-year franchise at a 7–7 record. He was head coach of the Columbus Destroyers from 2006 to 2008. In 2006, Kay led the Destroyers to their first non-losing season in the eight-year history of the franchise with an 8–8 record, setting franchise records for most wins and most road wins. He also tied a franchise record for most home wins with four. In 2007, despite a 7–9 regular season record, he won three playoff games and led the Destroyers to an appearance in ArenaBowl XXI, where they lost to the San Jose SaberCats. A 3–13 season in 2008 led to his dismissal. He later became an assistant for the Storm, where he was working when the league folded in 2017.

Head coaching record

College

AFL

References

External links

 Doug Kay page at ArenaFan Online
 1974 Olivet Football Team Hall of Fame Induction: Class of 2016

Year of birth missing (living people)
Living people
American football defensive backs
American football punters
American football quarterbacks
American football tight ends
Carolina Cobras coaches
Charlotte Rage coaches
Columbus Destroyers coaches
Arizona Rattlers coaches
Hawaii Rainbow Warriors football coaches
NFL Europe (WLAF) coaches
Olivet Comets football coaches
San Jose State Spartans football coaches
Tampa Bay Storm coaches
UCLA Bruins football coaches
United States Football League coaches
Western Illinois Leathernecks football coaches
Western Illinois Leathernecks football players
Western Illinois Leathernecks baseball players
High school football coaches in Illinois
Indiana State University alumni
United States Army soldiers
Sportspeople from Chicago
Players of American football from Chicago